Don Tolhurst (24 June 1929 – 21 February 2005) was an Australian sports shooter. He competed at four Olympic Games.

References

1929 births
2005 deaths
Australian male sport shooters
Olympic shooters of Australia
Shooters at the 1956 Summer Olympics
Shooters at the 1960 Summer Olympics
Shooters at the 1964 Summer Olympics
Shooters at the 1968 Summer Olympics
Sportspeople from Sydney
20th-century Australian people